Samalut (from  t-Semulot) is a city and a municipal division in the Minya Governorate in Egypt. It is located on the west bank of the Nile, a few hours by train south of Cairo.

The earliest known reference to the city of Samalut can be found in a Coptic funerary inscription that possibly dates back to the 5th century AD.

Religion
Near Samalut is the Coptic Orthodox Monastery of the Virgin Mary at Gebel el-Teir, an important Christian pilgrimage site. Samalut's church was built by Empress Helena, mother of Constantine the Great, in AD 328, on one of the sites where the Holy Family is believed to have stayed during their flight into Egypt.

See also
Holy Family in Egypt

References

Populated places in Minya Governorate